The African Journal of Range & Forage Science is a quarterly peer-reviewed scientific journal that covers the management and sustainable utilisation of natural and agricultural resources. It is published by Taylor & Francis and the National Inquiry Services Centre on behalf of the Grassland Society of Southern Africa. The editor-in-chief is James Bennett (Coventry University).

Abstracting and indexing
The journal is abstracted and indexed in the Science Citation Index Expanded, The Zoological Record, and BIOSIS Previews. According to the Journal Citation Reports, the journal has a 2016 impact factor of 0.961.

References

External links
 
 African Journal of Range & Forage Science at African Journals OnLine

Publications established in 1966
Agricultural journals
Taylor & Francis academic journals
Quarterly journals
English-language journals